Vittoria Light also known as the Victory Lighthouse, is an active lighthouse in Trieste, Italy, serving the Gulf of Trieste. It is located on the hill of Gretta (Poggio di Gretta), off the Strada del Friuli. At a height of  it is one of the tallest lighthouses in the world.

History
The idea to raise a monument in the vicinity arose during World War I, following capture of Kobarid in the Battles of the Isonzo and following the Battle of the Piave River. Originally the lighthouse was to rise on the coast of Istria, near Pula. However, the location eventually chosen was the hill of Gretta, due to ideal height (60m above sea-level) and the solid foundations of the former Austrian fort Kressich, built between 1854 and 1857. The lighthouse plans took shape following the end of the war, in December 1918. It was designed by Triestine architect Arduino Berlam.

Work started only in 1923 and ended on May 24, 1927, with the inauguration in the presence of King Vittorio Emanuele III.

The structure celebrates the Italian victory and commemorates the fallen of the first world war, as testified by the inscription "SPLENDI E RICORDA I CADUTI SUL MARE MCMXV-MCMXVIII" (shine and remind of the fallen on sea 1915–1918).

In 1979 the lighthouse was closed for restoration for seven years, and was reopened to the public May 18, 1986.

Structure
The large base of the lighthouse includes the earthwork of the Austrian fort. The bottom of structure is covered by stone from Carso (specifically from Gabrie) and the top is covered by stone from Istria (specifically from Vrsar).

Above the column is a capital and a crow's nest, in which the bronze crystal cage of the lantern is inserted.

Two projectiles of the Austrian battleship SMS Viribus Unitis are placed on both sides of the lighthouse entry.

The light itself is an electrical light since its first lighting. The current light is a 1000 watt halogen bulb.

Visiting
The site of the lighthouse is open to the public. The lighthouse itself is open Saturday and Sunday 3 pm to 7 pm, from the last Saturday of April to the second Sunday of October. Reaching the top requires climbing 285 steps.

See also
 List of tallest lighthouses in the world
 List of lighthouses in Italy

Notes

References

External links

 
 Servizio Fari Marina Militare 

Lighthouses completed in 1927
Lighthouses in Italy
Buildings and structures in Trieste
Tourist attractions in Friuli-Venezia Giulia